Niemen may refer to:

Neman river
Czesław Niemen, Polish musician
Niemen (album)
HMS Niemen
HMS Niemen (1809)
Grupa Niemen (Niemen Group), a former name of SBB (band), Poland

See also

Nieman (disambiguation)
Neman (disambiguation)